The 1930 Central State Bearcats football team represented Central State Teachers College, later renamed Central Michigan University, in the Michigan Collegiate Conference (MCC) during the 1930 college football season. In their second and final season under head coach Butch Nowack, the Bearcats compiled a 6–2 record (1–2 against MCC opponents), shut out four of eight opponents, and outscored all opponents by a combined total of 108 to 81. The team lost to its in-state rivals Western State Teachers (0–54) and Michigan State Normal (0–13), but defeated Northern State Teachers (34–0) and Detroit City College (13–0). Coach Nowack left Central State in the spring of 1931 to accept a coaching position at Indiana.

Schedule

References

Central State
Central Michigan Chippewas football seasons
Central State Bearcats football